The Bob Feller Act of Valor Award, created in 2013, is a set of awards originally presented annually to a member of the National Baseball Hall of Fame, a current Major League Baseball player, and a United States Navy Chief Petty Officer. In 2015, the Act of Valor Award Foundation added the Jerry Coleman Award to honor a United States Marine Corps Staff Noncommissioned Officer (SNCO), and two more Act of Valor awards for junior sailor peer-to-peer mentoring organizations. The baseball recipients are honored for their support of United States servicemen and women; the military awardees are honored for achievement that represents the character of Bob Feller. The Award is presented by the Bob Feller Act of Valor Award Foundation in conjunction with Major League Baseball, the National Baseball Hall of Fame and Museum, the Cleveland Guardians, and with the support of the United States Navy and Marine Corps.

Background 
The award is named for Bob Feller, who put his baseball career on hold and became the first American professional athlete to enlist in the armed forces, volunteering for combat service in the United States Navy the day after the attack on Pearl Harbor. Feller was inducted into the National Baseball Hall of Fame in 1962, his first time on the ballot. When asked, "What is the most important game you ever won?", he would answer "World War II". He took great pride in his time in the military, and never once regretted placing service to his country before himself. "I didn’t worry about losing my baseball career. We needed to win the war. I wanted to do my part." Feller wanted to be remembered as, "An American, who happened to be a ballplayer". Despite losing almost four full seasons to wartime service, Feller had an impressive baseball career and was elected to the Hall of Fame in 1962. He and Jackie Robinson were elected in their first year of eligibility, the first players to be so honored since the inaugural class of 1936. Feller died in 2010.

History 
Peter Fertig conceived the award. He wrote letters to the National Baseball Hall of Fame and Museum, Major League Baseball, the Cleveland Indians,  and the USS Alabama, and said that "within six weeks, I had everybody's support". He garnered support from the business community in Cleveland, as well as Feller's widow Anne Feller. Then he worked with Islip, New York, councilman John Cochrane in drafting a proposal. Rear Admiral Michael Jabaley of the United States Navy helped mentor Peter with gaining official support from the United States Navy. It became an official Navy award on Memorial Day, 2013.

In 2013, its inaugural year, three awards were given to represent Bob Feller's life as an MLB player, a U.S. Navy Chief Petty Officer, and a National Baseball Hall of Famer. The award also recognized 37 Hall of Fame players, owners, umpires, and broadcasters that served during World War II. Three MLB finalists were named by the award's board of directors, three Navy Chief Petty Officer finalists were selected by the U.S. Navy, and the board of directors selected the Hall of Famer. The announcement of the award took place at the Hall of Fame ceremony on May 25, followed by a presentation to the finalists on July 6, and a selection of the winners on Veterans Day. The awards were presented at the United States Navy Memorial in Washington, D.C.

Jerry Coleman Award 
On July 28, 2015, the Bob Feller Act of Valor Award Foundation announced that it would present the Jerry Coleman Award to honor a Marine Staff Noncommissioned Officer (SNCO) who "possesses outstanding leadership and unyielding support for the United States Marine Corps and the United States of America". As the 75th Secretary of the Navy, the honorable Ray Mabus made the recommendation for the award to the board of directors, explaining that as Secretary of the Navy, he is responsible for the entire Naval community which includes the United States Marine Corps. The award is named after Jerry Coleman, awarded MLB Rookie of the Year (1949), All-Star (1950), and World Series MVP (1950), all with the New York Yankees. Coleman was also a longtime broadcaster for the San Diego Padres and was honored with the Ford C. Frick Award, presented by the National Baseball Hall of Fame. Coleman served in the United States Marine Corps in World War II and Korea.

Peer-to-peer mentoring awards 
Beginning in 2015, along with the Bob Feller and Jerry Coleman Awards, the Foundation added two peer-to-peer mentoring awards, one for afloat and one for ashore organizations. The awards "honor groups of junior Sailors that have excelled in encouraging other Sailors to embody the Navy's core values of honor, courage, and commitment, and have worked together to promote peer-to-peer mentorship and reduce destructive personal decision-making and behaviors". The Sailors range from ages 18 to 25 years old.

Award recipients

World War II Hall of Fame Members

Gallery

See also 
 Roberto Clemente Award
 Lou Gehrig Memorial Award
 Marvin Miller Man of the Year Award
 Branch Rickey Award
 Jackie Robinson Award

References 

Major League Baseball trophies and awards
Awards established in 2013
2013 establishments in the United States